The Norfolk Carnegie Library in Norfolk, Nebraska is a Carnegie library which was built in 1910.  It was listed on the National Register of Historic Places in 1998.

It has Classical Revival details.  It was designed by Norfolk architect J.C. Stitt and built by contractor L.H. Woerth.

It is a one-story  brick building with cream sandstone trimmings.  It has a raised basement and a hipped roof.

Norfolk was one of 68 communities in Nebraska that were awarded Carnegie library grant funds.

References

Libraries on the National Register of Historic Places in Nebraska
Neoclassical architecture in Nebraska
Library buildings completed in 1910
National Register of Historic Places in Madison County, Nebraska
Carnegie libraries in Nebraska